Kaduwela Divisional Secretariat is a Divisional Secretariat  of Colombo District, of Western Province, Sri Lanka.
This divisional Secretariat also encompasses the area of the Kaduwela polling division.

List of divisions
Korathota Grama Niladhari Division
Pahala Bomiriya B Grama Niladhari Division

References

 Divisional Secretariats Portal

Divisional Secretariats of Colombo District